Andre Ho (born April 11, 1992) is a Canadian table tennis player. He competed at the 2012 Summer Olympics in the Men's singles, but was defeated in the preliminary round.

Ho was born in Vancouver, British Columbia and lives in Richmond, British Columbia. Ho is a Chinese Canadian.

References

1992 births
Living people
Canadian people of Chinese descent
Canadian male table tennis players
Olympic table tennis players of Canada
People from Richmond, British Columbia
Sportspeople from Vancouver
Table tennis players at the 2012 Summer Olympics
Table tennis players at the 2014 Commonwealth Games
Commonwealth Games competitors for Canada